Tyronne Efe Ebuehi (born 16 December 1995) is a Nigerian professional footballer who plays as a right back for Italian  club Empoli. Born in the Netherlands, he represents the Nigeria national team.

Club career
Born in Haarlem, Ebuehi played for Dutch youth teams of several amateur clubs before joining professional team ADO Den Haag from amateur side HFC EDO in 2013. He made his Eredivisie debut on 10 August 2014 in a 1–0 home defeat to Feyenoord. Three seasons later, on 19 May 2018, he signed a five-year contract with Portuguese club S.L. Benfica. Due to injury, however, he missed the whole 2018–19 season.

On 28 June 2021, Ebuehi joined newly promoted Serie A side Venezia on a season-long loan.

On 5 July 2022, Ebuehi signed a contract with Empoli in Italy until June 2025.

International career

In November 2016, Ebuehi was called up for the first time to the Nigeria national team for a 2018 FIFA World Cup qualifier against Algeria. However, he declined the call-up by stating that he needed some time to settle into his team ADO Den Haag. He was later called up for friendlies against Senegal and Burkina Faso in March 2017 and joined up with the squad. He made his senior debut for Nigeria in a 3–0 friendly win over Togo on 1 June 2017.

Ebuehi was in Nigeria's 23-man squad for the World Cup in Russia. He came on as a substitute in the second half of a 2–0 victory over Iceland on 22 June 2018.

On 5 October 2019, Ebuehi got a late invite to play for the Super Eagles in a friendly against Brazil after defender Kenneth Omeruo got injured while on club duty. This marked his return to the national team since the match against Iceland in the FIFA World Cup.

Personal life
Ebuehi was born in the Netherlands to a Nigerian father and a Dutch mother.

Career statistics

Honours
Benfica
Supertaça Cândido de Oliveira: 2019

References

External links

1995 births
Living people
Footballers from Haarlem
Citizens of Nigeria through descent
Dutch people of Nigerian descent
Nigerian people of Dutch descent
Association football fullbacks
Nigerian footballers
Nigeria international footballers
Dutch footballers
Eredivisie players
Liga Portugal 2 players
Serie A players
ADO Den Haag players
S.L. Benfica B players
FC Twente players
Venezia F.C. players
Empoli F.C. players
2018 FIFA World Cup players
Expatriate footballers in Portugal
2021 Africa Cup of Nations players